Cili is a county in Hunan Province, China under administration of the prefecture-level city of Zhangjiajie. Located in the north of Hunan and the east of Zhangjiajie, Cili County is bordered to the southeast by Taoyuan County, to the south and the southwest by Yongding District, to the west and the northwest by Sangzhi County, to the north and northeast by Shimen County. Cili is also the home of the Tujia people. It is divided into 25 township-level divisions (November 27, 2015), its county seat is Lingyang Town.

Recently  a tomb was discovered around Cili that was 2,200 years old. Among the items discovered  was a bronze cooking vessel that contained fish. The tomb was that of an ancient senior official .

Administrative divisions
According to the result on adjustment of township-level administrative divisions of Cili County on November 27, 2015, it has 15 towns and 10 townships (7 of which are ethnic townships of the Tujia people) under its jurisdiction. Its county seat is Lingyang. they are:

15 Towns
 Dongyueguan
 Erfangping: formed by merging  the former Erfangping and Jinglongqiao 2 townships.
 Gaoqiao, Cili
 Guangfuqiao
 Jiangya, Cili
 Lingxi, Cili: formed by merging  the former Chaoyang Township and Lingxi Town.
 Lingyang, Cili
 Longtanhe: formed by merging  the former Jinping Township and Longtanhe Town.
 Miaoshi, Cili
 Sanhekou, Cili: formed by merging the former Guotaiqiao, Zhuangta and Sanhekou 3 townships.
 Shamuqiao
 Tongjinpu
 Xiangshi, Cili
 Xikou, Cili
 Yanbodu: 6 villages of the former Yichongqiao Township merging to it.

3 Townships
 Dongxi, Cili
 Nanshanping
 Yangliupu

7 Tujia ethnic townships
 Ganyan, Cili: 14 villages of the former Yichongqiao Township merging to it.
 Gaofeng, Cili
 Jinyan, Cili
 Sanguansi
 Xujiafang
 Yanghe, Cili
 Zhaojiagang

Climate

References

External links

 
Zhangjiajie
County-level divisions of Hunan